Fatalism is a family of related philosophical doctrines that stress the subjugation of all events or actions to fate or destiny, and is commonly associated with the consequent attitude of resignation in the face of future events which are thought to be inevitable.

Definition
The term "fatalism" can refer to any of the following ideas:
 Any view according to which human beings are powerless to do anything other than what they actually do. Included in this is the belief that humans have no power to influence the future or indeed the outcome of their own actions. 
 The belief that events are decided by fate and are outside human control.
 One such view is theological fatalism, according to which free will is incompatible with the existence of an omniscient God who has foreknowledge of all future events. This is very similar to theological determinism.
 A second such view is logical fatalism, according to which propositions about the future which we take to currently be either true or false can only be true or false if future events are already determined.
 A third such view is causal determinism. Causal determinism (often simply called "determinism") is now usually treated as distinct from fatalism, on the grounds that it requires only the determination of each successive state in a system by that system's prior state, rather than the final state of a system being predetermined.
 The view that the appropriate reaction to the inevitability of some future event is acceptance or resignation, rather than resistance. This view is closer to everyday use of the word "fatalism", and is similar to defeatism.

Religion
The idea that the entire universe is a deterministic system has been articulated in both Eastern and non-Eastern religions, philosophy, and literature.

The ancient Arabs that inhabitated the Arabian Peninsula before the advent of Islam used to profess a widespread belief in fatalism (ḳadar) alongside a fearful consideration for the sky and the stars as divine beings, which they held to be ultimately responsible for every phenomena that occurs on Earth and for the destiny of humankind. Accordingly, they shaped their entire lives in accordance with their interpretations of astral configurations and phenomena.

In the I Ching and philosophical Taoism, the ebb and flow of favorable and unfavorable conditions suggests the path of least resistance is effortless (see: Wu wei). In the philosophical schools of the Indian Subcontinent, the concept of karma deals with similar philosophical issues to the Western concept of determinism. Karma is understood as a spiritual mechanism which causes the eternal cycle of birth, death, and rebirth (saṃsāra). Karma, either positive or negative, accumulates according to an individual's actions throughout their life, and at their death determines the nature of their next life in the cycle of Saṃsāra. Most major religions originating in India hold this belief to some degree, most notably Hinduism, Jainism, Sikhism, and Buddhism.

The views on the interaction of karma and free will are numerous, and diverge from each other greatly. For example, in Sikhism, god's grace, gained through worship, can erase one's karmic debts, a belief which reconciles the principle of karma with a monotheistic god one must freely choose to worship. Jainists believe in a sort of compatibilism, in which the cycle of Saṃsara is a completely mechanistic process, occurring without any divine intervention. The Jains hold an atomic view of reality, in which particles of karma form the fundamental microscopic building material of the universe.

Ājīvika
In ancient India, the Ājīvika school of philosophy founded by Makkhali Gosāla (around 500 BCE), otherwise referred to as "Ājīvikism" in Western scholarship, upheld the Niyati ("Fate") doctrine of absolute fatalism or determinism, which negates the existence of free will and karma, and is therefore considered one of the nāstika or "heterodox" schools of Indian philosophy. The oldest descriptions of the Ājīvika fatalists and their founder Gosāla can be found both in the Buddhist and Jaina scriptures of ancient India. The predetermined fate of living beings and the impossibility to achieve liberation (moksha) from the eternal cycle of birth, death, and rebirth was the major distinctive philosophical and metaphysical doctrine of this heterodox school of Indian philosophy, annoverated among the other Śramaṇa movements that emerged in India during the Second urbanization (600–200 BCE).

Buddhism

Buddhist philosophy contains several concepts which some scholars describe as deterministic to various levels. However, the direct analysis of Buddhist metaphysics through the lens of determinism is difficult, due to the differences between European and Buddhist traditions of thought.

One concept which is argued to support a hard determinism is the idea of dependent origination, which claims that all phenomena (dharma) are necessarily caused by some other phenomenon, which it can be said to be dependent on, like links in a massive chain. In traditional Buddhist philosophy, this concept is used to explain the functioning of the cycle of saṃsāra; all actions exert a karmic force, which will manifest results in future lives. In other words, righteous or unrighteous actions in one life will necessarily cause good or bad responses in another.

Another Buddhist concept which many scholars perceive to be deterministic is the idea of non-self, or anatta. In Buddhism, attaining enlightenment involves one realizing that in humans there is no fundamental core of being which can be called the "soul", and that humans are instead made of several constantly changing factors which bind them to the cycle of Saṃsāra.

Some scholars argue that the concept of non-self necessarily disproves the ideas of free will and moral culpability. If there is no autonomous self, in this view, and all events are necessarily and unchangeably caused by others, then no type of autonomy can be said to exist, moral or otherwise. However, other scholars disagree, claiming that the Buddhist conception of the universe allows for a form of compatibilism. Buddhism perceives reality occurring on two different levels, the ultimate reality which can only be truly understood by the enlightened, and the illusory and false material reality. Therefore, Buddhism perceives free will as a notion belonging to material reality, while concepts like non-self and dependent origination belong to the ultimate reality; the transition between the two can be truly understood, Buddhists claim, by one who has attained enlightenment.

Determinism and predeterminism
While the terms are sometimes used interchangeably, fatalism, determinism, and predeterminism are distinct, as each emphasizes a different aspect of the futility of human will or the foreordination of destiny. However, all these doctrines share common ground.

Determinists generally agree that human actions affect the future but that human action is itself determined by a causal chain of prior events. Their view does not accentuate a "submission" to fate or destiny, whereas fatalists stress an acceptance of future events as inevitable. Determinists believe the future is fixed specifically due to causality; fatalists and predeterminists believe that some or all aspects of the future are inescapable but, for fatalists, not necessarily due to causality.

Fatalism is a looser term than determinism. The presence of historical "indeterminisms" or chances, i.e. events that could not be predicted by sole knowledge of other events, is an idea still compatible with fatalism. Necessity (such as a law of nature) will happen just as inevitably as a chance—both can be imagined as sovereign. This idea has roots in Aristotle's work, "De interpretatione".

Theological fatalism is the thesis that infallible foreknowledge of a human act makes the act necessary and hence unfree. If there is a being who knows the entire future infallibly, then no human act is free. The early Islamic philosopher, Al Farabi, makes the case that if God does in fact know all human actions and choices, then Aristotle's original solution to this dilemma stands.

Idle argument
One famous ancient argument regarding fatalism was the so-called Idle Argument. It argues that if something is fated, then it would be pointless or futile to make any effort to bring it about. The Idle Argument was described by Origen and Cicero and it went like this:

If it is fated for you to recover from this illness, then you will recover whether you call a doctor or not.
Likewise, if you are fated not to recover, you will not do so whether you call a doctor or not.
But either it is fated that you will recover from this illness, or it is fated that you will not recover.
Therefore, it is futile to consult a doctor.

The Idle Argument was anticipated by Aristotle in his De Interpretatione chapter 9. The Stoics considered it to be a sophism and the Stoic Chrysippus attempted to refute it by pointing out that consulting the doctor would be as much fated as recovering. He seems to have introduced the idea that in cases like that at issue two events can be co-fated, so that one cannot occur without the other.

Logical fatalism and the argument from bivalence
The main argument for logical fatalism goes back to antiquity. This is an argument that depends not on causation or physical circumstances but rather is based on presumed logical truths. There are numerous versions of this argument, including those by Aristotle and Richard Taylor. These arguments have been objected to and elaborated on with some effect.

The key idea of logical fatalism is that there is a body of true propositions (statements) about what is going to happen, and these are true regardless of when they are made. So, for example, if it is true today that tomorrow there will be a sea battle, then there cannot fail to be a sea battle tomorrow, since otherwise it would not be true today that such a battle will take place tomorrow.

The argument relies heavily on the principle of bivalence: the idea that any proposition is either true or false.  As a result of this principle, if it is not false that there will be a sea battle, then it is true; there is no in-between.  However, rejecting the principle of bivalence—perhaps by saying that the truth of a proposition regarding the future is indeterminate—is a controversial view since the principle is an accepted part of classical logic.

Criticism

Semantic equivocation

One criticism comes from the novelist David Foster Wallace, who in a 1985 paper "Richard Taylor's Fatalism and the Semantics of Physical Modality" suggests that Taylor reached his conclusion of fatalism only because his argument involved two different and inconsistent notions of impossibility. Wallace did not reject fatalism per se, as he wrote in his closing passage, "if Taylor and the fatalists want to force upon us a metaphysical conclusion, they must do metaphysics, not semantics. And this seems entirely appropriate." Willem deVries and Jay Garfield, both of whom were advisers on Wallace's thesis, expressed regret that Wallace never published his argument. In 2010, the thesis was, however, published posthumously as Time, Fate, and Language: An Essay on Free Will.

See also

 Accidental necessity
 Amor fati
 Calvinism
 Divine providence
 Inshallah
 Jansenism
 Libertarianism (metaphysics)
 Problem of future contingents
 Probability theory
 Shikata ga nai
 Superstition 
 Theological determinism
 Theological fatalism

Notes

References

External links

Fatalism vs. Free Will from Project Worldview

Determinism
Causality
Destiny